Dávid Takács (born 15 February 1986) is a Hungarian middle-distance runner specialising in the 800 metres. He represented his country at two consecutive World Indoor Championships. In addition, he finished sixth in the final at the 2007 European Indoor Championships in Birmingham.

International competitions

Personal bests
Outdoor
400 metres – 47.11 (Budapest 2009)
800 metres – 1:47.56 (Budapest 2009)
1500 metres – 3:46.31 (Veszprém 2007)

Indoor
400 metres – 47.41 (Budapest 2006)
800 metres – 1:48.12 (Vienna 2006)
1000 metres – 2:20.79 (Karlsruhe 2007)
1500 metres – 3:54.14 (Budapest 2004)

References

1986 births
Living people
Hungarian male middle-distance runners
Competitors at the 2007 Summer Universiade
Competitors at the 2009 Summer Universiade
21st-century Hungarian people